Gordon County is a county located in the northwestern part of the U.S. state of Georgia. As of the 2020 census, the population was 57,544. The county seat is Calhoun. Gordon County comprises the Calhoun, GA Micropolitan Statistical Area, which is included in the Atlanta-Athens-Clarke County-Sandy Springs, GA Combined Statistical Area.

History 
Gordon County was created on February 13, 1850 by an act of the Georgia General Assembly. The new county was formed from portions of Cass (later renamed Bartow) and Floyd counties.  All lands that would become Gordon County were originally occupied by the Cherokee Indians—and, in fact, the area was home of New Echota, the last seat of the Cherokee Nation.  Even while Cherokees remained on their homeland, the General Assembly enacted legislation in December 1830 that provided for surveying the Cherokee Nation in Georgia and dividing it into sections, districts, and land lots.  Subsequently, the legislature identified this entire area as "Cherokee County" (even though it never functioned as a county). An act of December 3, 1832 divided the Cherokee lands into ten new counties—Cass (later renamed Bartow), Cherokee, Cobb, Floyd, Forsyth, Gilmer, Lumpkin, Murray, Paulding, and Union. Cherokee lands were distributed to whites in a land lottery, but the legislature temporarily prohibited whites from taking possession of lots on which Cherokees still lived.

It was not until December 29, 1835 that Georgia had an official basis for claiming the unceded Cherokee lands that included the future location of Gordon County. In the Treaty of New Echota, a faction of the Cherokees agreed to give up all Cherokee claims to land in Georgia, Alabama, Tennessee, and North Carolina and move west in return for $5  million. Though a majority of Cherokees opposed the treaty and refused to leave, the U.S. and Georgia considered it binding. In 1838, U.S. Army troops rounded up the last of 15,000 Cherokees in Georgia and forced them to march west in what came to be known as the "Trail of Tears", making this area the starting point of the removal.

Gordon County's original 1850 boundaries were changed numerous times between 1852 and 1877, during which time the legislature transferred portions of Cass (Bartow), Floyd, Murray, Pickens, and Walker counties to Gordon County, while transferring land from Gordon to Floyd and Murray counties.

Georgia's 94th county was named for William Washington Gordon (1796–1842), the first Georgian to graduate from West Point and first president of the Central of Georgia Railroad.

Geography

Mountains in Gordon County include Baugh Mountain and Horn Mountain.

The eastern half of Gordon County is located in the Coosawattee River sub-basin of the ACT River Basin (Coosa-Tallapoosa River Basin).  Most of the western half of the county is located in the Oostanaula River sub-basin of the same larger ACT River Basin, while a small northerly portion of the county, between Resaca and Industrial City, is in the Conasauga River sub-basin of the ACT River Basin.

Major highways

  Interstate 75
  U.S. Route 41
  U.S. Route 411
  State Route 3
  State Route 53
  State Route 53 Spur
  State Route 61
  State Route 136
  State Route 136 Connector
  State Route 156
  State Route 225
  State Route 401 (unsigned designation for I-75)

Adjacent counties

 Murray County - north
 Whitfield County - north
 Gilmer County - northeast
 Pickens County - east
 Cherokee County - southeast
 Bartow County - south
 Floyd County - west
 Walker County - northwest

National protected area
 Chattahoochee National Forest (part)

Demographics

2000 census
As of the census of 2000, there were 44,104 people, 16,173 households, and 12,259 families living in the county.  The population density was 124 people per square mile (48/km2).  There were 17,145 housing units at an average density of 48 per square mile (19/km2).  The racial makeup of the county was 89.69% White, 3.46% Black or African American, 0.27% Native American, 0.53% Asian, 0.05% Pacific Islander, 4.98% from other races, and 1.01% from two or more races.  7.41% of the population were Hispanic or Latino of any race.

There were 16,173 households, out of which 35.80% had children under the age of 18 living with them, 60.40% were married couples living together, 11.10% had a female householder with no husband present, and 24.20% were non-families. 20.30% of all households were made up of individuals, and 8.10% had someone living alone who was 65 years of age or older.  The average household size was 2.70 and the average family size was 3.08.

In the county, the population was spread out, with 26.10% under the age of 18, 9.50% from 18 to 24, 31.40% from 25 to 44, 22.50% from 45 to 64, and 10.60% who were 65 years of age or older.  The median age was 34 years. For every 100 females there were 99.00 males.  For every 100 females age 18 and over, there were 97.10 males.

The median income for a household in the county was $38,831, and the median income for a family was $43,184. Males had a median income of $29,761 versus $22,256 for females. The per capita income for the county was $17,586.  About 7.50% of families and 9.90% of the population were below the poverty line, including 12.10% of those under age 18 and 14.30% of those age 65 or over.

2010 census
As of the 2010 United States Census, there were 55,186 people, 19,715 households, and 14,653 families living in the county. The racial makeup of the county was 85.2% white, 3.6% black or African American, 1.0% Asian, 0.4% American Indian, 0.1% Pacific islander, 7.7% from other races, and 2.0% from two or more races. Those of Hispanic or Latino origin made up 14.0% of the population. In terms of ancestry, 14.6% were American, 9.8% were Irish, 6.9% were English, and 6.7% were German.

Of the 19,715 households, 39.3% had children under the age of 18 living with them, 55.8% were married couples living together, 12.9% had a female householder with no husband present, 25.7% were non-families, and 21.6% of all households were made up of individuals. The average household size was 2.77 and the average family size was 3.20. The median age was 36.0 years.

The median income for a household in the county was $40,916 and the median income for a family was $47,964. Males had a median income of $37,358 versus $28,394 for females. The per capita income for the county was $18,285. About 13.7% of families and 17.1% of the population were below the poverty line, including 22.7% of those under age 18 and 17.1% of those age 65 or over.

2020 census

As of the 2020 United States Census, there were 57,544 people, 20,561 households, and 15,002 families residing in the county.

Economy 

In addition to service industries, the economy of Gordon County is rooted in manufacturing and both heavy and light industry.  Mohawk Industries, a leading manufacturer of flooring, is headquartered in Gordon County.  In addition, Shaw Industries, Beaulieu International Group, LG Chem, and Kobelco Construction Machinery America - a division of Kobe Steel - have significant presences in Gordon, County.

Culture 

Gordon County was the home of the Georgia Yellow Hammers, an old-time music group from the 1920s.  The Yellow Hammers, chiefly composed of Bill Chitwood, Clyde Evans, Bud Landress, Charles Ernest Moody, and Phil Reeve were one of the most important bands during the heyday of old-time music.  They have left their mark on the community.  The Calhoun High School (Calhoun, Georgia) Yellow Jackets football team play in Phil Reeve Stadium.  Mr. Moody was the author of songs which are today Southern Gospel standards including "Drifting Too Far From the Shore" which has been covered and recorded by such artists as Jerry Garcia, Emmylou Harris, Phil Lesh, Hank Williams and many others.

Rail accidents 
Two fatal rail accidents took place in Gordon County in the late 20th century. The first one was in 1981 when Southern Railway train #160 collided with a log truck near the community of Oostanaula.  The engineer and the driver of the log truck were fatally injured.  In 1990, Train #188 ran a stop signal at the north end of the siding at Davis, Georgia and collided with Train #G38 on the same line. The engineer and conductor on #G38 and the conductor on #188 died in this collision.  A monument stands at the site of the collision near the Georgia Highway 136 crossing.

Politics 
Bert Lance, an advisor to Jimmy Carter's successful presidential campaign, served as Chairman of the Board of Calhoun First National Bank, later acquired by Trust Company of Georgia, forerunner of SunTrust; it is now part of Truist Financial.  As of 2020, Carter is the final Democratic nominee to win Gordon County (1980).

Since 1980, Republicans have had a strong base in Gordon County.

Education

Gordon County public schools

High schools
 Sonoraville High School
 Gordon Central High School

Middle schools
 Redbud Middle School
 Ashworth Middle School

Elementary schools
 Fairmount Elementary School
 Belwood Elementary School
 W.L. Swain Elementary School
 Max V. Tolbert Elementary School
 Red Bud Elementary School
 Sonoraville Elementary School

Private schools
 Georgia-Cumberland Academy
 John L. Coble Elementary School

Calhoun city schools
 Calhoun Primary School - formerly known as Eastside Primary School
 Calhoun Elementary School
 Calhoun Middle School
 Calhoun High School

Communities

Cities
 Calhoun
 Fairmount
 Plainville

Towns
 Resaca
 Ranger

Unincorporated communities
 Sugar Valley
 Sonoraville
 Oakman
 Oostanaula
 Red Bud
 Cash
 Ryo

Media 
 Calhoun Times and Gordon County News, 210 S. King St., is the official legal organ of Gordon County. Established in 1870, the newspaper is the oldest business in Calhoun and Gordon County.

Recreational complexes
 Calhoun Recreation Department, Calhoun, Georgia
 The Sonoraville Recreational Complex in Sonoraville, Georgia

See also

 National Register of Historic Places listings in Gordon County, Georgia
 Resaca Confederate Cemetery
 Gordon County, New South Wales
List of counties in Georgia

References

External links
 Listen to Gordon County Sheriff and Fire radio
 Gordon County, Georgia Genealogy
 Gordon County, Georgia Genealogy & History
 Gordon County historical marker

 
Georgia (U.S. state) counties
1850 establishments in Georgia (U.S. state)
Northwest Georgia (U.S.)
Counties of Appalachia
Populated places established in 1850